Mireille Laufilitoga is a politician from Wallis and Futuna. She has been a member of the Territorial Assembly of Wallis and Futuna since 2012, serving as president of the Permanent Committee from 2017 to 2022. An independent, she represents the Mua District.

Political career 
Mireille Laufilitoga was elected for her first five-year term as a member of the Territorial Assembly of Wallis and Futuna in 2012. She represents the Mua District on Wallis as an independent candidate. She was reelected in the 2017 and 2022 Wallis and Futuna Territorial Assembly elections.

During her time in the Assembly, she has served on various committees including the financial, regional integration, agriculture, and women's issues committees. From 2017 to 2022, she served as president of the Permanent Committee.

Laufilitoga ran as an alternate candidate for Robert Laufoaulu and David Vergé, respectively, to represent Wallis and Futuna in the French Senate in 2014 and 2020.

Other 
Laufilitoga is also known as a singer. In 2007, she released the album Nuanua with her cousin, the Wallisian singer Sosefo Tukumuli.

References 

Living people
Wallis and Futuna women in politics
Members of the Territorial Assembly of Wallis and Futuna
Oceanian singers
21st-century politicians
21st-century women politicians